Notropis imeldae, the sardinita de Rio Verde,  is a species of ray-finned fish in the family Cyprinidae.
It is found only in Mexico.

References

 

imeldae
Freshwater fish of Mexico
Endemic fish of Mexico
Fish described in 1968
Taxonomy articles created by Polbot